Nanticoke may refer to:

 Nanticoke people in Delaware, United States
 Nanticoke language, an Algonquian language
 Nanticoke Lenni-Lenape, a state-recognized tribe in New Jersey

Place names

Canada
 Nanticoke, Ontario
 Nanticoke Generating Station, formerly the largest coal-fired power plant in North America
 Nanticoke Solar Facility, a solar power station built on the site of the former Nanticoke GS

United States
 Nanticoke River in Delaware and Maryland
 Nanticoke Hundred, an unincorporated subdivision of Sussex County, Delaware
 Nanticoke, Maryland, an unincorporated community
 Nanticoke, New York, a town
 Nanticoke, Pennsylvania, a city